Hazel Run is a stream in northeastern St. Francois County in the U.S. state of Missouri. It is a tributary of the Terre Bleue Creek.

The stream headwaters arise northeast of the community of Hazel Run and it flows west passing about one-half mile north of Hazel Run to its confluence with Terre Bleue Creek about three quarters of a mile northeast of that stream's confluence with Big River.

Hazel Run was so named on account of hazel trees near its course.

See also
List of rivers of Missouri

References

Rivers of St. Francois County, Missouri
Rivers of Missouri